The Frauen DFB-Pokal 1988–89 was the 9th season of the cup competition, Germany's second-most important title in women's football. In the final which was held in Berlin on 24 June 1989 TSV Siegen defeated FSV Frankfurt 5–1, thus winning their fourth cup in a row. It was their fourth cup title overall, too.

Participants

First round

Quarter-finals

Replay

Semi-finals

Final

See also 

 1988–89 DFB-Pokal men's competition

References 

Fra
DFB-Pokal Frauen seasons